This is a list of vice presidents in 2023.

Africa
  Vice President – Esperança da Costa (2022–present)
  Vice President – Slumber Tsogwane (2018–present)

First Vice President of Patriotic Movement for Safeguard and Restoration – vacant (2022–present)
Second Vice President of Patriotic Movement for Safeguard and Restoration – vacant (2022–present)
  – Vice President – Mariam Chabi Talata (2021–present)
  – Vice President – Prosper Bazombanza (2020–present)
  Vice-chairmen of Transitional Military Council – Djimadoum Tiraina (2021–present)
 Vice President – vacant (2019–present)
 Vice President – Teodoro Nguema Obiang Mangue (2016–present)
 Vice President – 
vacant (2019–2023)
Rose Christiane Raponda (2023–present)
  Vice President – Badara Joof (2022–present)
  Vice President – Mahamudu Bawumia (2017–present)
  Vice President – Tiémoko Meyliet Koné (2022–present)
  Deputy President – Rigathi Gachagua (2022–present)
  Vice President – Jewel Taylor (2018–present)
 
 Vice-Chairmen of the Presidential Council – Abdullah al-Lafi (2021–present)
 Vice-Chairmen of the Presidential Council – Musa Al-Koni (2021–present)
  Vice President – Saulos Chilima (2020–present)
  Vice President – vacant (2021–present)
  Vice President – Eddy Boissezon (2019–present)
  Vice President – Nangolo Mbumba (2018–present)
  Vice President – Yemi Osinbajo (2015–present)
  Vice President – Ahmed Afif (2020–present)
  Vice President – Mohamed Juldeh Jalloh (2018–present)
  Vice President – Abdirahman Saylici (2010–present)
  Deputy President – 
David Mabuza (2018–2023)
Paul Mashatile (2023–present)
 
First Vice President – Riek Machar (2020–present)
Second Vice President – James Wani Igga (2020–present)
Third Vice President – Taban Deng Gai (2020–present)
Fourth Vice President – Rebecca Nyandeng Garang (2020–present)
Fifth Vice President – Hussein Abdelbagi (2020–present)
  – Deputy Chairman of Transitional Sovereignty Council – Mohamed Hamdan Dagalo (2021–present)
  Vice President – Philip Mpango (2021–present)
 
 First Vice President – Othman Masoud Sharif (2021–present)
 Second Vice President – Hemed Suleiman Abdalla (2020–present)
  Vice President – Jessica Alupo (2021–present)
  Vice President – Mutale Nalumango (2021–present)
 
First Vice presidents – Constantino Chiwenga (2017–present)
Second Vice President – vacant (2021– present)

Asia
  Vice President – Badr Gunba (2020–present)
 
 First Deputy Leader – Sirajuddin Haqqani (2021–present)
 Second Deputy Leader – Mullah Yaqoob (2021–present)
 Third Deputy Leader – Abdul Ghani Baradar (2021–present)
  Vice President – Mehriban Aliyeva (2017–present)
  Vice President – Wang Qishan (2018–present) 
  Vice President – Jagdeep Dhankhar (2022–present)
  Vice President – Ma'ruf Amin (2019–present)
 
First Vice President – Mohammad Mokhber (2021–present)
Others Vice presidents – 
Vice President for Economic Affairs – Mohsen Rezaei Mirghaed (2021–present)
Vice President and Head of Plan and Budget Organisation – Seyyed Masoud Mirkazemi (2021–present)
Vice President and Head of Administrative and Recruitment Affairs Organisation – Meysam Latifi (2021–present)
Vice President for Legal Affairs – Mohammad Dehghan (2021–present)
Vice President for Parliamentary Affairs – Seyyed Mohammad Hosseini (2021–present)
Vice President for Science and Technology Affairs – Sorena Sattari (2013–present)
Vice President for Women and Family Affairs – Ensieh KhazAli (2021–present)
Vice President and Head of Atomic Energy Organization – Mohammad Eslami (2021–present)
Vice President and Head of Foundation of Martyrs and Veterans Affairs – Seyyed Amir Hossein Ghazizadeh Hashemi (2021–present)
Vice President and Head of Department of Environment – Ali Salajegheh (2021–present)
Vice President for Executive Affairs – Seyyed Solat Mortazavi (2021–present)
 
 Vice President – vacant (2018–present)
 Vice President – vacant (2018–present)
 Vice President – vacant (2018–present)
 
 First Vice President – Mustafa Said Qadir (2019–present)
 Second Vice President – Jaafar Sheikh Mustafa (2019–present)
 
 Vice presidents de facto
 First vice-president of State Affairs Commission – Choe Ryong-hae – (2019–present)
 Vice-president of State Affairs Commission – Kim Tok Hun (2021–present)
 Vice presidents de jure
 Vice Chairman of the Standing Committee of Supreme People's Assembly – Pak Yong-il (2019–present)
 Vice Chairman of the Standing Committee of Supreme People's Assembly – Kang Yun Sok (2021–present)
 
 Vice President – Pany Yathortou (2021–present)
 Vice President – Bounthong Chitmany (2021–present)
  Vice President – Faisal Naseem (2018– present)
 
 First Vice President – Myint Swe (2016–present)
 Second Vice President – Henry Van Thio (2016–present)
  Vice President – Nanda Kishor Pun (2015–present)
  Vice President – Sara Duterte (2022–present)
Syria
 
 Vice President – Najah al-Attar (2006–present)
 Vice President – vacant (2021– present)

First Vice President – Abdel Ahad Astifou, (2021–present)
 Second Vice President – Abdel Hakim Bashar (2019–present)
 Third Vice President – Ruba Habboush (2020–present)
 Vice President – Lai Ching-te (2020–present)
 Vice President – Fuat Oktay (2018–present)
 Vice President – Sheikh Mohammed bin Rashid Al Maktoum (2006–present)
 Vice President – Võ Thị Ánh Xuân (2021–present)
Yemen
 Vice President – Ali Mohsen al-Ahmar (2016–present)
   Supreme Political Council (unrecognised, rival government) Deputy Head of the Supreme Political Council – Qassem Labozah (2016–present)

Europe
  Vice President – Iliana Iotova (2017–present)
  Vice President – vacant (1974–present)
  Vice President – Viola Amherd (2023–present)

North America and the Caribbean
 
First Vice President – Stephan Brunner (2022–present)
Second Vice President – Mary Munive (2022–present)
  Vice President – Salvador Valdés Mesa (2019–present)
  Vice President – Raquel Peña de Antuña (2020–present)
  Vice President – Félix Ulloa (2019–present)
  Vice President – Guillermo Castillo (2020–present)
 
First Vice President – Salvador Nasralla (2022–present)
Second Vice President – Doris Gutiérrez (2022–present)
Third Vice President – Renato Florentino (2022–present)
  Vice President – Rosario Murillo (2017–present)
  Vice President – Jose Gabriel Carrizo (2019–present)
  Vice President – Kamala Harris (2021–present)

Oceania
  Vice President – Teuea Toatu (2019–prezent)
  Vice President – Aren Palik (2022–present)
  Minister Assisting the President – Martin Hunt (2019–present)
  Vice President – Uduch Sengebau Senior – (2021–present)
  
Member of Council of Deputies –  vacant (2017–present)
Member of Council of Deputies –  vacant (2018–present)
Member of Council of Deputies –  Le Mamea Ropati (2016–present)

South America
  Vice President – Cristina Fernández de Kirchner (2019–present)
  Vice President – David Choquehuanca (2020–present)
  Vice President – Geraldo Alckmin (2023–present)
  Vice President – Francia Márquez (2022–present)
  Vice President – Alfredo Borrero (2021–present)
 
First Vice President – Mark Phillips (2020–present)
Vice President – Bharrat Jagdeo (2020–present)
  Vice President – Hugo Velázquez Moreno (2018–present)
 
First Vice President – vacant (2022–present)
Second Vice President – vacant (2020–present)
  Vice President – Ronnie Brunswijk (2020–present)
  Vice President – Beatriz Argimón (2020–present)
  Vice President – Delcy Rodríguez (2018–present)

See also
List of current vice presidents and designated acting presidents

References

External links
CIA

Lists of vice presidents
Vice presidents